Daniel Seth Dworkin (born May 23, 1972) is an American screenwriter and television producer.

He and writing partner Jay Beattie, are best known for co-creating Matador  alongside Roberto Orci for Robert Rodriguez's El Rey Network in 2014. The series starred Gabriel Luna, Alfred Molina, Nicky Whelan, Neil Hopkins, and Elizabeth Peña.

Together, Dan and Jay also developed MTV's Scream, an anthology television series, based on the popular horror film franchise, which premiered on June 30, 2015.

His other TV writing credits include: Revenge, The Event, Cold Case, Criminal Minds and American Horror Story: 1984, the ninth season of the FX  horror anthology television series, American Horror Story.

His short fiction has been published on Pseudopod and Popcorn Fiction.

References

Living people
American television writers
American male television writers
American television producers
American male writers
American male screenwriters
1972 births